The Great Company may refer to one of several armies of mercenaries in the late medieval period:
The free companies that ravaged France and Italy
 Catalan Company, sometimes called the Catalan Great Company
 Great Company (German), operative in Italy in the 1350s
 Great Company (English), first operative in eastern France and Provence in the 1350s, then in Italy, where it became the White Company

See also
Hudson's Bay Company, often referred to as the great company